The Cook Islands Natural Heritage Trust is a programme of the Government of the Cook Islands to collect and integrate scientific and traditional information on local organisms (plants, animals and microbes) and related subjects (geology, ethnography etc...); which can be accessed at the Cook Islands Biodiversity database. The programme and driving force behind the CINHT is Gerald McCormack. Originally the Cook Islands Natural Heritage Project, the programme came about when Gerald felt, in the course of his educational work, that there should be a list of the local flora and fauna available to locals. This modest goal expanded over the years and continues to expand with Gerald at the helm. 

The Natural Heritage Project was initiated by Sir Geoffrey Henry within his Prime Minister's Department in 1990. The Project moved into the Natural Heritage Trust when it was established in 1999 by an Act of Parliament. At this time the project employed its first assistant - funded by NZ Ministry of Foreign Affairs & Trade, and administered by Volunteer Service Abroad  - a taxonomic specialist graduate from New Zealand to work with Gerald on identifying and entering species into the developing multimedia database of flora and fauna. See more about the Cook Islands Biodiversity database.

The primary funding for the trust and its database is from the Cook Islands Government. In addition, there has been essential funding from NZAID, SDC, Bishop Museum, PBIN, GEF, and UNDP.

Gerald McCormack is Director of the Cook Islands Natural Heritage Trust and was coordinator of the project to transfer the Rimatara lorikeet (kura in Cook Islands Māori) at Atiu to establish a reserve population.

References

External links
 Cook Islands Biodiversity & Natural Heritage

Biodiversity
Environment of the Cook Islands